Roesbrugge-Haringe is a place in the Belgian province of West Flanders. It is a part of the municipality (a deelgemeente) of Poperinge. Roesbrugge-Haringe consists of two small rural villages, Roesbrugge and Haringe, located in the north western region of Poperinge. Roesbrugge, the largest of both villages, is located along the Yser river. Haringe is located one kilometer to the south west of Roesbrugge, close to the French border.

Poperinge
Populated places in West Flanders